John McIntyre (10 February 1942 – 26 July 2009) was a Canadian rower. He competed in the men's coxed eight event at the 1968 Summer Olympics.

References

1942 births
2009 deaths
Canadian male rowers
Olympic rowers of Canada
Rowers at the 1968 Summer Olympics
Rowers from Hamilton, Ontario